Marek Pająk (born 26 November 1977) is a Polish musician. In 2010, he joined death metal band Vader as their lead and rhythm guitarist.

Pająk was endorsed by Ibanez and Schecter guitars. He currently uses Jackson Guitars, and DL David Laboga Cabinets.

Discography 
Esqarial
Amorphous (1998, Propaganda Promotion)
Discoveries (2001)
Inheritance (2002, Empire Records)
Klassika (2004, Empire Records)
Burned Ground Strategy (2008, Propaganda Promotion)

Vader
Necropolis (2009, Nuclear Blast, as guest)
Welcome to the Morbid Reich (2011, Nuclear Blast)
 Go to Hell (EP, 2014, Nuclear Blast)
 Tibi et Igni (2014, Nuclear Blast)
 Future of the Past II – Hell in the East (2015, Witching Hour Productions)
 The Empire (2016, Nuclear Blast)
 Thy Messenger (EP, 2019, Nuclear Blast)
 Solitude in Madness (2020, Nuclear Blast)

 Amorphous
Return from the Dead (2008, Propaganda Promotion)
Modus Operandi (2010, Propaganda Promotion)
A Perfect Evil (2012, Let It Bleed Records)

Panzer X
Steel Fist (EP, 2006, Metal Mind Productions)

References 

1977 births
21st-century Polish male singers
21st-century Polish singers
Death metal musicians
English-language singers from Poland
Living people
Polish heavy metal guitarists
Polish heavy metal singers
Polish lyricists
Rhythm guitarists
Vader (band) members
21st-century guitarists
Polish male guitarists